Tragilos is a village and a former municipality in the Serres regional unit, Greece. Since the 2011 local government reform it is part of the municipality Visaltia, of which it is a municipal unit. The municipal unit has an area of 197.758 km2. Population 3,885 (2011). The seat of the municipality was in Mavrothalassa.

References

Populated places in Serres (regional unit)

bg:Черкезкьой (дем)